Michel Fau (born 1964) is a French comedian, actor and theatre director.

Personal life

At 18, he left his hometown for training at French National Academy of Dramatic Arts from 1986 to 1989. He trained with Michel Bouquet, Gerard Desarthe and Pierre Vial.

He has appeared on stage regularly in works directed by Olivier Py and he also worked with Olivier Desbordes, Jean Sébastien Rajon, Pierre Guillois, Jean-Luc Lagarce, Jean-Michel Rabeux, Jean-Claude Penchenat, Laurent Gutmann, Stéphane Braunschweig, Jacques Weber, Sandrine Kiberlain, Léa Drucker, Gaspard Ulliel, Julie Depardieu, Charlotte de Turckheim, Chantal Ladesou, Catherine Frot, Samir Guesmi, ...

In cinema, he worked with directors like Jean-Paul Rappeneau, Gilles Bourdos, Albert Dupontel, Dominik Moll, François Ozon, Benoît Jacquot, Noémie Lvovsky,  Nina Companeez, Jean-Michel Ribes, Xavier Giannoli, Christophe Honoré, Josée Dayan, André Téchiné, ...

He occasionally directs an interpretation workshop at the French National Academy of Dramatic Arts.

During the Night of the 2011 Molière Award, he made a cover of Carla Bruni's song Quelqu'un m'a dit in a parody of classical singer.

Filmography

Theater

External links

1964 births
Living people
20th-century French male actors
21st-century French male actors
French male film actors
French male television actors
French male stage actors
French theatre directors
People from Agen
Officiers of the Ordre des Arts et des Lettres